Full of Elevating Pleasures is the fourth studio album by the Japanese electronica/rock band, Boom Boom Satellites. It was released on March 24, 2005. Two of the tracks on the album, "Dive for You" and "Anthem", were featured on the soundtrack for the 2004 CGI film Appleseed.

On the Oricon ranking, the album reached a peak rank of 20 and charted for 9 weeks.

Track listing

Sources

Boom Boom Satellites albums
2005 albums